Lyulka was a USSR aero engine design bureau and manufacturer from 1938 to the 1990s, when manufacturing and design elements were integrated as NPO Saturn based at Rybinsk. The Lyulka design bureau had its roots in the "Kharkiv Aviation Institute" ( Ukrainian SSR ) where Arkhip Mikhailovich Lyulka was working with a team designing the ATsN (Agregat Tsentralnovo Nadduva - Centralised supercharger) installation on the Petlyakov Pe-8 bomber. Lyul'ka was responsible for designing the first Soviet gas turbine engines. Preferring to steer away from copying captured German equipment, it succeeded in producing home grown engines.

Engines

References

 Gunston, Bill. “The Osprey Encyclopaedia of Russian Aircraft 1875–1995”. London, Osprey. 1995.

External links
 http://www.ctrl-c.liu.se/misc/ram/

Aircraft engine manufacturers of the Soviet Union